The Mesoregion of Assis (or Paranapanema Valley's Mesoregion) is one of the 15 mesoregions of the São Paulo state, Brazil. It is located at the southwest portion of the state, and has an area of 12,710.210 km² and the seat of mesoregion is in Assis.

The population of the mesoregion is 567,858 inhabitants (IBGE/2010), spread over 35 municipalities.

The boundaries of Paranapanema Valley Region is Itapetininga's Mesoregion (at east), Presidente Prudente's Mesoregion (at west), Marília's Mesoregion and Bauru's Mesoregion (north), Mesoregion of Pioneer North of Paraná and Mesoregion of North Central of Paraná (at South). The GDP is R$10.949.020,00  and the region is an important and strategic way to access the South of Brasil and Mercosul. The principal resource of Paranapanema Valley economy is Sugarcane, Agribusiness, Electronics, Software, Products chemical, Food, mechanical and others.

The microregions have a huge integration with cities. Actually, Ourinhos is the most populated city in region, followed by Assis, Paraguaçu Paulista and Santa Cruz do Rio Pardo, they have populations of more than 40,000. The limits of the region with Paraná state is Paranapanema River. The region was unoccupied until the twentieth century, when the first villages were created, but only with arrival of the railroad (Estrada de Ferro Sorocabana, Sorocabana Railway) the region 
developed. Over the years, the city began to receive public services like education, health, water and electricity. The main road in the region is the Raposo Tavares Highway that cuts through the middle region, connecting the state capital to the city of Presidente Prudente.

Because the connection history, especially in Microregion of Ourinhos, there is a great influence on Pioneer North of Paraná, mainly in the cities of Jacarezinho, Santo Antonio da Platina and Cambará. Meanwhile, in the Microregion of Assis, the connection with the Paraná is greatly reduced and the integration is mainly among the municipalities in the region, mainly Tarumã, Cândido Mota, Palmital and Paraguaçu Paulista. For better integration of the cities, there are as CIVAP  intermunicipal arrangements (Intermunicipal Consortium of Paranapanema Valley) and UMMES (Union of Municipalities of the Middle Sorocabana) aimed at sharing common interests for development.

In addition, the region is well served by secondary technical schools (such as Etecs maintained by State Technological Education Center Paula Souza, Centro Estadual de Educação Tecnológica Paula Souza), colleges (such as Integrated College Ourinhos, Faculdades Integradas de Ourinhos), institutes (such as the Federal Institute of São Paulo at Assis), universities (like the State University Paulista with campuses at Assis and Ourinhos). Highlighting the UNESP (Assis and Ourinhos), Fatec of Ourinhos and the FEMA (Assis Educational Foundation) at Assis.

Municipalities
All data from IBGE/2010

Microregion of Assis
Population: 263.861
Area (km²): 7,141.738
Population density (km²): 37.2

Cities: Assis, Borá, Campos Novos, Cândido Mota, Cruzália, Florínia, Ibirarema, Iepê, Lutécia, Maracaí, Nantes, Palmital, Paraguaçu Paulista, Pedrinhas Paulista, Platina, Quatá, Tarumã

Microregion of Ourinhos
Population: 289.917
Area (km²): 5,568.472 
Population density (km²): 53.0

Cities: Bernardino de Campos, Canitar, Chavantes, Espírito Santo do Turvo, Fartura, Ipaussu, Manduri, Óleo, Ourinhos, Piraju, Ribeirão do Sul, Salto Grande, Santa Cruz do Rio Pardo, São Pedro do Turvo, Sarutaiá, Taguaí, Tejupá, Timburi

References

Most populous cities in Mesoregion of Assis 

Assis